Manannah Township is a township in Meeker County, Minnesota, United States. The population was 610 at the 2000 census.  Most of the city of Eden Valley is located in Manannah Township

Manannah Township was organized in 1857, and named after Manannah.

Geography
According to the United States Census Bureau, the township has a total area of 38.6 square miles (99.9 km2), of which 38.5 square miles (99.6 km2) is land and 0.1 square miles (0.3 km2) (0.31%) is water.

Manannah Township is located in Township 121 North of the Arkansas Base Line and Range 31 West of the 5th Principal Meridian.

Demographics
As of the census of 2000, there were 610 people, 207 households, and 168 families residing in the township.  The population density was 15.9 people per square mile (6.1/km2).  There were 216 housing units at an average density of 5.6/sq mi (2.2/km2).  The racial makeup of the township was 99.84% White and 0.16% Asian. Hispanic or Latino of any race were 0.49% of the population.

There were 207 households, out of which 40.1% had children under the age of 18 living with them, 70.5% were married couples living together, 4.8% had a female householder with no husband present, and 18.4% were non-families. 16.4% of all households were made up of individuals, and 6.8% had someone living alone who was 65 years of age or older.  The average household size was 2.95 and the average family size was 3.27.

In the township the population was spread out, with 32.6% under the age of 18, 6.2% from 18 to 24, 27.5% from 25 to 44, 21.1% from 45 to 64, and 12.5% who were 65 years of age or older.  The median age was 35 years. For every 100 females, there were 114.8 males.  For every 100 females age 18 and over, there were 117.5 males.

The median income for a household in the township was $39,813, and the median income for a family was $41,250. Males had a median income of $28,500 versus $20,774 for females. The per capita income for the township was $14,077.  About 7.1% of families and 8.2% of the population were below the poverty line, including 6.8% of those under age 18 and 8.6% of those age 65 or over.

References

Townships in Meeker County, Minnesota
Townships in Minnesota
1857 establishments in Minnesota Territory
Populated places established in 1857